Adazi-Nnukwu is a town in  Anaocha Local Government Area, Anambra State, Nigeria.

References 

Populated places in Anambra State